The farmer's bent-toed gecko (Cyrtodactylus petani) is a species of lizard in the family Gekkonidae. The species is endemic to Java.

Etymology
C. petani was discovered in 2006 on a farm, hence its common name.  The specific name, petani, means "farmer" in the Indonesian language.

Geographic range
C. petani is found in eastern Java, in the province of East Java.

Description

Reproduction
The mode of reproduction of C. petani is unknown.

References

Further reading
Riyanto A, Grismer LL, Wood PL Jr (2015). "The fourth Bent-toed Gecko of the genus Cyrtodactylus (Squamata: Gekkonidae) from Java, Indonesia". Zootaxa 4059 (2): 351–363. (Cyrtodactylus petani, new species).

Cyrtodactylus
Reptiles described in 2015